Ziying (子嬰) may refer to:
 or Ying of Zheng, the seventh monarch of the duchy of Zheng, vassal state of the Zhou dynasty. Also known as Viscount of Zheng.
Ziying of Qin, the third ruler of the Qin dynasty.
Ruzi Ying, the emperor of the Han dynasty.